Pointe-à-Callière Museum is a museum of archaeology and history in Old Montreal, Quebec, Canada. It was founded in 1992 as part of celebrations to mark Montreal's 350th birthday. The museum has collections of artifacts from the First Nations of the Montreal region that illustrate how various cultures coexisted and interacted, and how the French and British regimes influenced the history of this territory over the years. The site of Pointe-à-Callière has been included in Montreal’s Birthplace National Historic Site since its designation in 1924.

It receives more than 350,000 visitors a year. Nearly 4.5 million people have come to the museum since it opened in 1992. It has received more than fifty national and international awards, including those in museography, architecture, and for cultural, educational and community activities.  The museum is affiliated with: the Canadian Museums Association, the Canadian Heritage Information Network, and the Virtual Museum of Canada.

The museum complex comprises three archaeological sites: Pointe-à-Callière, Place Royale and 214 Place d'Youville; the archaeological field school at Fort Ville-Marie; Montreal's first Catholic cemetery; the William collector sewer;  an archaeological crypt: Place Royale; a heritage building: the former Youville Pumping Station; 165-169 Place d’Youville, the Mariners House; and archaeological collections of over a million objects.

History
The Pointe-à-Callière, Montréal Archaeology and History Complex opened in 1992. The original plan had been to open up the William collector sewer and the remains of St. Anne's Market and the Parliament of the United Province of Canada. Recent archaeological digs brought to light the remains of Fort Ville-Marie and of Governor Louis-Hector de Callière’s home, which are planned for display in a future expansion to expose the Little Saint-Pierre River canalized by the William sewer, and the archaeological remains of St. Anne's Market, home to the Parliament of the United Province of Canada between 1844 and 1849. Visitors will be led to a new exhibition hall, with its entrance on McGill Street, for future international exhibitions on ancient civilizations and their cultures.

In 1996 the museum held its first travelling exhibition, Water In, Waste Out, presented at the Musée de la civilisation (Quebec City) and the Musée et sites archéologiques Saint-Romain-en-Gal (Vienne, France). In 1997, at the Art and Archaeology exhibition 20 Montreal high school students were able to exhibit their works at the Musée et sites archéologiques Saint-Romain-en-Gal. 1690: The Siege of Québec... The Story of a Sunken Ship has travelled to different locations in Quebec and internationally since 2000. France / New France. Birth of a French People in North America, which has already been presented in the Maritimes, toured internationally. The museum also has an exhibition on underground Montreal as part of a cultural route in the underground pedestrian corridors of the Quartier international de Montréal.

Museum complex

The Pointe-à-Callière stands above several historic and archaeological sites of national significance, showcasing major periods in the history of Montreal. Some of the archaeology exposed during construction of the building has been left in situ as part of the museum's permanent display on the history of the city. The museum was constructed on pilings to stay existing finds undisturbed and protected.

The main entrance of the museum rises above the point of land where Paul de Chomedey, Sieur de Maisonneuve, Jeanne Mance and other French settlers landed in 1642.

Complex components
 L'Éperon building
 Old Custom House - built in 1836

Exhibits

The museum displays archaeological remains from every period in the city's past, and the sites it protects have produced one of the largest archaeological collections in Canada. The museum's staff specialize in research, conservation, outreach activities and managing archaeology and history. In partnership with universities, it conducts research on the city's archaeology and history, and its ethnohistorical collections include artifacts and documents donated locally. The museum also displays exhibits on the city's built and industrial heritage.

Permanent exhibitions include 1701 - The Great Peace of Montréal, Archaeo-Adventure, Building Montréal, Crossroads Montréal, Memory Collector, Pirates or privateers?, Where Montréal Began, and Yours Truly, Montréal multimedia show.

Along with its permanent exhibitions, since it opened the museum has presented more than thirty temporary exhibitions on themes relating to local and international archaeology, history and heritage, culture and artistic creativity, and multiculturalism. Education and outreach programs and cultural activities are available for school groups and the general public on other aspects of archaeology and history. The museum also hosts musical performances, theatre and demonstrations, including lectures, debates and participation in Montreal, Quebec, cross-Canada and international events. The museum works with Native and cultural communities. For ceremonies commemorating the 300th anniversary of the 1701 Great Peace of Montreal in 2001, the museum’s main partners were aboriginal groups from Quebec, the rest of Canada and the United States.

Temporary exhibitions

2014-2015
The Greeks: Agamemnon to Alexander the Great
2014
Marco Polo: an epic Journey
2013-2014
Lives and Times of the Plateau
The Beatles in Montréal
2013
The Tea Road
2012-2013
Samurai: The Prestigious Collection of Richard Béliveau
2012
The Etruscans: An Ancient Italian Civilization
2011-2012
Colors of India
2011
To Your Health, Cesar! Wine with the Gauls
2010-2011
St.Catherine Street makes the Headlines
2010
Easter Island: An Epic Voyage
100 years underground
Discovering legends with Jean-Claude Dupont
2009-2010
Pirates, Privateers and Freebooters;2008-2009
Costa-Rica: Land of wonders!
2008
France, New France: birth of a French people in North America'
2007-20081837•1837, Rebellions, Patriotes vs Loyalists2007First Nations, French Royal Collections2006-2007St. Lawrence Iroquoians, Corn People2006Japan2005-2006Jules Verne, Writing the Sea2005Encounters in Roman Gaul2004-2005Old Montréal in a New Light2004Oceania2003-2004Dreams and Realities Along the Lachine Canal2003Archaeology and the Bible – From King David to the Dead Sea Scrolls2002-2003Varna – World's First Gold, Ancient SecretsA Collection from the Varna Museum, Bulgaria
2002Saint-Laurent, Montréal's "Main”2001–2002Mysteries of the Moche of Peru20011701 – The Great Peace of Montréal2000–2001Africa Musica!Exploring a Collection from the Museo Pigorini
20001690: The Siege of Québec... The Story of a Sunken Ship1999–2000Treasures from the South of Italy — Basilicata, Land of Light1999Montréal, by Bridge and Crossing1998–1999Art and Archaeology: Young Artists from Lyon at the MuseumTreasures from the Ukrainian Steppes1998The Ravages of Time: Restoring Heritage Objects from FranceCrucifixion: Unique Archaeological Evidence from Jerusalem1997–1998Bannock, Baguette, Bagel – Montréal Bread1997Abitibiwinni, 6,000 Years of HistoryArt and Archaeology1996–1997Ancient Cyprus: 8,000 Years of Civilization1996Dream Merchants. The Emergence of Cinema in QuebecWater In, Waste Out. The History of Aqueducts, Water Mains and Sewers in Montréal1995–1996Window Stories1995The Port as Seen by Pierre Bourgault, Gilles Vigneault and Helmut Lipsky1994–1995Bones and Bottles — Fragments of History''

See also 
 Archaeology in Quebec

References

External links

Pointe-à-Callière Museum within Google Arts & Culture

Archaeological museums in Canada
History museums in Quebec
History of Montreal
Museums in Montreal
Old Montreal
Postmodern architecture in Canada